Lorimier (Anglicized as Loramie) is a French surname (from Old French lorimer, a maker of horses' bits). It may refer to:

Persons
Claude-Nicolas-Guillaume de Lorimier (1744–1825), businessman, official and political figure in Lower Canada
François-Marie-Thomas Chevalier de Lorimier (1803–1839), notary who fought for the independence of Lower Canada
Pierre-Louis de Lorimier (1748–1812), aka Peter Loramie, French-Canadian fur trader and frontiersman in Ohio Country

Places
Old Lorimier Cemetery: Cape Girardeau, Missouri; established in 1808 by Pierre-Louis de Lorimier
Loramie Creek, Ohio
Loramie Creek AVA, Ohio
Loramie Township, Shelby County, Ohio
Lake Loramie State Park, Ohio
Fort Loramie, Ohio, established as a fur trading post by Pierre-Louis de Lorimier
Fort Loramie High School, Fort Loramie, Ohio

See also
Lorimer (disambiguation)
Laramie (disambiguation)